The Australian Capital Territory Proof of Identity Card is a voluntary identity photo card available to all residents of the Australian Capital Territory (ACT), Australia The purpose is mainly to access restricted services for people over the age of 18 or to prove identity for those without a driver's licence.

References

Identity documents of Australia